Leo Stopfer (born 15 May, 1964) is an Austrian artist who is widely acclaimed as the "Painter of the Ballet-Stars". He is especially identified with the subject of ballet and more than half of his works depict famous dancers of world fame.

Biography

Early life and art techniques
 1979 – first drawings;
 1981 – inspired by Picassos works he starts painting with oil-color; 
 1982 – first personal exhibition; 
 1989/90 — "The earth has a skin" – organic abstract paintings in his special mixed technique (with soil, stones, sand and dry plants mixed with acrylic- or oil-colors creating a relief on canvas) is the main part of his work until 2009.

Ballerina Paintings
In 1989, Leo Stopfer created his first pastel paintings and drawings of the ballerina Mitra Nayeri.

Later, Stopfer made the ballet one of the main themes of his art. Cooperating with many dancers for many years he created many paintings depicting the ballerinas of the 20th and 21st centuries. Among them are such grandees of the world ballet scene such as Diana Vishneva (the Mariinsky Theatre), Olga Smirnova and Evgenia Obraztsova (Bolshoi Theatre), Vladimir Malakhov (Berlin State Ballet), Maria Abashova (Ballet Theatre of Boris Eifman), Maria Yakovleva (Vienna State Ballet) and Isabelle Ciaravola and Ludmila Pagliero (Opera de Paris).

Exhibitions
Since his first exhibition in 1982, Stopfer's work has been exhibited all around the Europe, including London, Vienna, Berlin, Moscow and Luxembourg.

Leo Stopfer was the first artist to be invited by the Klimt Villa in Vienna in 2017 to work in the original studio where the master Gustav Klimt lived and worked. The result of this work was dozens of drawings and a large number of women's portraits united under the title "my muses". This series of works was presented at the personal exhibition of Leo Stopfer in the Klimt Villa in May 2018.

Stopfer had a current solo exhibition that took place at the Vienna State Opera. At the invitation of the directorate of the Vienna State Opera, Leo Stopfer presented to the public an exhibition of his works capturing dancers of the house.

Style
Stopfer's earlier paintings are landscapes in an organic-abstract style, using a mixed impasto technique. He combined earth, sand and stones with acrylic paint to develop a relief-like texture.

The artist likes to work with acrylic combined with pencil. He also sometimes works with mixed media, using gouache when the ballerinas dance on his canvas to make prints with their feet.

In his works, the artist tries to express a portion of the dancer's energy. The models depicted by Leo Stopfer are always characterized by heightened sensuality and frankness.

References

Bibliography

External links
 Leo Stopfer's website
 Galerie Ei article

1964 births
Austrian painters
20th-century painters
21st-century painters
Living people